Sir Terence Alexander Hawthorne English  (born October 1932) is a South African-born British retired cardiac surgeon.  He was Consultant Cardiothoracic Surgeon, Papworth Hospital and Addenbrooke's Hospital, Cambridge, 1973–1995. After starting a career in mining engineering, English switched to medicine and went on to lead the team that performed Britain's first successful heart transplant in August 1979 at Papworth, and soon established it as one of Europe's leading heart–lung transplant programmes.

Born into a family of mixed Irish, Afrikaans, Yorkshire and Scottish descendants, English's father died at age 49, leaving his mother to bring up two children in South Africa. After completing a degree in Mining Engineering in Johannesburg, he was inspired by a maternal uncle, who was a surgeon, to study medicine, and with the financial aid of an unexpected legacy travelled to London. After completing his medical training at Guy's Hospital Medical School, he was stimulated by the pioneering open heart surgery taking place in the 1960s and he embarked on a career in cardiac surgery and then specialised in cardiac transplantation.

English became president of the Royal College of Surgeons 1989–92, Master of St Catharine's College 1993–2000, Deputy Lieutenant for Cambridgeshire 1994–2001 and president of the British Medical Association 1995–1996. A member of the General Medical Council (GMC) (1983–1989), he has also been president of International Society of Heart and Lung Transplantation 1984–1985 and holds multiple international honorary fellowships and Doctorates of medical colleges and universities. He was knighted, KBE in 1991.

Early life and education 

Terence English was born in Pietermaritzburg, South Africa, to Mavis and Arthur English. He has an older sister called Elizabeth. Arthur English died from silicosis when Sir Terence was two years old.

School 

English went to Parktown Preparatory School for boys in Johannesburg and at the age of ten was sent to board at Cordwallis school in Pietermaritzburg and in 1946 completed his schooling at Hilton College in Natal.

Engineering and university, mining to medicine 

After leaving school at the age of seventeen, English worked for a year in what was then Rhodesia (now Zimbabwe), as a diamond driller with the Cementation Company (Africa) Ltd on a dam near Salisbury (now Harare). This skill was useful in providing opportunities for summer jobs while he was studying for a BSc in mining engineering at Witwatersrand University in Johannesburg, which he completed in 1954.

His qualifications later provided opportunities for employment in mining exploration in Northern Quebec and the Yukon.

Medical school 

In his penultimate year of engineering, he unexpectedly inherited £2,000 from a family trust and decided this would enable him to change to medicine and spend his professional career as a doctor rather than an engineer. English applied to Guy's Medical School and was accepted by the Dean, George Houston providing he finished his engineering degree successfully. He did this and George Houston was later to play a key role in English's career when he agreed to readmit him after he had resigned during the 2nd year of his studies. Later, he was awarded an honorary fellowships of Guy's Hospital at the same time as Houston.

In 1961, English captained the Guy's 1st XV team when they won the Rugby Inter-Hospitals Cup.

Surgical career 

After completing medical school and internship, English started his surgical training with leading surgeons including Donald Ross and Sir Russell later Lord Brock. He also made a working visit with Christiaan Barnard at Groote Schuur Hospital in South Africa. After obtaining the FRCS in general surgery he completed his cardiothoracic training at the Royal Brompton Hospital, London Chest and National Heart Hospitals, with a year's research Fellowship with John Kirklin in Birmingham, Alabama.

Heart surgery and Papworth 

English became consultant cardiothoracic surgeon to Papworth and Addenbrooke's Hospitals, 1972 – 1995.

A clinical moratorium on heart transplants in the UK was announced by Sir George Godber, Chief Medical Officer (United Kingdom) in February 1973. This was a result of poor results in most units around the world during the years following Christiaan Barnard's first transplant in December 1967 apart from Stanford University's in California where Norman Shumway had pioneered heart transplantation and Barnard's unit in Cape Town. It was felt at the time that cardiac transplantation required more research into the management of rejection, more donors and a change in public opinion. Three months after the moratorium on heart transplantation, English became inspired by a visit to his friend Philip Caves, at Stanford University, who had developed the technique of transvenous endomyocardial biopsy to detect acute organ rejection at an early stage, and was then Chief Resident in Shumway's unit. Caves had been working with pathologist Margaret Billingham, who devised the scoring system for early rejection. This advance and better knowledge of how to use drugs for immunosuppression had led to a significant improvement in results at Stanford and he decided that it was time for the UK to have its own programme of heart transplantation based on what he had seen there. So in October 1973 formal meetings began between surgical colleagues at Papworth and Sir Roy Calne at Addenbrooke's where there was already an active programme of kidney and liver transplantation. In preparation for this English did some open heart surgery at Addenbrooke's Hospital and also became involved with Roy Calne's pig heart transplant research.

Subsequently, English embarked on his own research at Huntingdon Research Centre directed towards defining the best way of preserving myocardial function during the period of anoxia between the heart's removal from the donor and its transplantation into the recipient. This comprised a combination of hypothermic, and pharmacological inhibition of metabolism and allowed safe periods of storage of the donor heart for up to 6 hours. By the end of 1977 English felt ready to embark on a clinical programme and submitted his plans to the Transplant Advisory Panel (TAP) of the Department of Health. He was received politely when the TAP met in January 1978 but was later informed that there was no funding for a heart transplant programme and they did not want to see any one-off operations. However, English managed to obtain permission from the Chairman of Cambridge Health Authority to use his facilities at Papworth for two transplants and after the first failed in January 1979, the second in August 1979 was successful and the patient Keith Castle lived for over five years. English carried on with developing the heart transplant programme and became Director of the British Heart Foundation Transplant Research Unit at Papworth (1980–1998).

In 2013, Eric Hunter's grandson acknowledged English in his tribute to his grandfather who had three consecutive heart transplants.

Factors in the transplant programme development 

 The criteria for establishing brainstem death published by the UK Medical Royal Colleges and their Faculties in October 1976, allowed removal of a heart from a brain-dead donor.
 Improvements in donor heart preservation allowed for organs to be retrieved from hospitals far from Papworth. 
 After 1983 there was a dramatic rise in the number of worldwide heart transplants, largely due to better control of acute rejection from the use of cyclosporin instead of azathioprine, steroids and anti-thymocyte globulin. 
 Political opposition versus philanthropy. After failing to get funding from the Transplant Advisory Panel, English obtained support for the first two from the Area health Authority and then funding from the Cambridge millionaire David Robinson. Other sources followed until 1985 when the DoH provided secure funding for both transplant units at Papworth and Harefield Hospital. 
 Concern amongst sectors of the medical profession and Michael Petch's withdrawal of cardiological support. 
 Public view of medicine and surgery at the time.

The artificial heart 

English performed the first total artificial heart transplant in the UK in November 1986. A Jarvic 7 heart was used as a bridge to transplantation until a human donor heart could be found and the patient subsequently survived nearly two years.

UK cardiac surgical register 

English was involved with establishing the annual UK cardiac surgical register in 1978 which provided annual 30 day mortality statistics for all cardiac operations from every cardiac surgical unit in the UK and Ireland.

Other roles

Member General Medical Council, GMC, 1983-1989 

Representing the Royal College of Surgeons, English served initially on the Preliminary Proceedings Committee of the GMC. Later, he became a member of the Education Committee the GMC and was involved in the debate on specialist certification.

President of the International Society for Heart Transplantation 1984–1985 
A founding member of the International Society for Heart Transplantation, English subsequently received the Society's Lifetime Achievement Award 2014.

President of Royal College of Surgeons 1989–1992 

In 1981, English was elected to the Royal College of Surgeon's Council, following which, in 1989, he became president.

Some of his achievements as President of RCS included:

 Re-establishing the College's international programme with visits to Thailand and Malaysia/Singapore and then Pakistan and India. 
 Playing a key role in avoiding a split between the BMA and the colleges. 
 Being responsible for presidents of the surgical specialist associations becoming invited members of the RCS Council.
 Implementing the 'English Clause' during the 1991 New Deal for Junior Doctors Hours. This allowed surgical trainees to work beyond the stipulated 72 hours providing this was voluntary and they were not under pressure to do this. It worked well until abolished by the DoH 6 years later.
 Involvement in the NHS Reform Bill and resistance to managerial bureaucracy. 
 Insisted on including the BMA in the Clinical Services Advisory Group (CSAG). Proposals to radically reform the NHS by the Conservative government in 1990 had planned to exclude the BMA. English played a key role by refusing to co-operate with the CSAG unless the Joint Consultants Committee chairman, Tony Grabham was a member.

President of the British Medical Association 1995–1996 

English publicly supported the extended role of nurses.

Master of St Catharine's College Cambridge 1993–2000 

Elected master of St Catharine's College, where English spent seven years. In his farewell speech he expressed admiration for the wide educational and social background of the students and their hard work and range of extra-curricular activities. He also regretted the increasing bureaucracy of performance assessment exercises that the academic staff were being subjected to.

Hunterian trustee since 1994 

English has been an elected trustee of the Hunterian Museum of the Royal College of Surgeons since 1994.

English also became a Member of the Audit Commission 1993–1998, Chief Medical Advisor to Bupa 1992–1999, Deputy Lieutenant, Cambridgeshire 1994–2001 and a Member of Council, Winston Churchill Memorial Trust 1995–2009.

Honours and awards 

 1951 – Transvaal Chamber of Mines Scholarship. 
 1979 – Travelling Scholarship, Society for Cardiothoracic Surgery in Great Britain and Ireland.
 1980 – Man of the Year, The Royal Association for Disability and Rehabilitation.
 1986 – Clement Price Thomas Award (RCS England), in recognition of outstanding contributions to surgery. 
 2009 – Lifetime Achievement Award (Society for Cardiothoracic Surgery in Great Britain and Ireland) for outstanding contributions to cardiothoracic surgery.
 2014 – Lifetime Achievement Award from the International Society for Heart and Lung Transplantation in Recognition of Outstanding Achievements and Tireless Dedication in the Field of Heart and Lung Transplantation.
 2014 – The Ray C Fish Award for Scientific Achievement in Cardiovascular Disease from the Texas Heart Institute. 
In addition, English has ten Honorary Fellowships from Medical Colleges around the world and honorary doctorates from Sussex, Hull, Oxford Brookes University, University of Nantes, Mahidol University Thailand and Witwatersrand.

Personal life 

English married Ann Dicey in South Africa in 1963. They had four children and raised their family in Cambridge. They divorced in 2001 and she died in 2009. He married Judith Milne (now Judith English) in 2002. She became Principal of St Hilda's College, Oxford and they continue to live in Oxford.

Retirement 

English has continued to be active since retiring, participating in 
 Trauma care training of doctors in Pakistan and Gaza. 
 Regular visits to Gaza on medical projects and assisting with the treatment of Gaza's wounded. 
 Supporting the legalization of physician assisted dying as Patron for 'Dignity in Dying'. 
 Engaging with friends in nine long-distance 4X4 Adventure Drives across continents and to remote parts of the world between 1998 and 2009.

Books and publications 

 "Follow Your Star" From Mining to Heart Transplants – A Surgeon's Story (AuthorHouse 2011).
 Principles of Cardiac Diagnosis and Treatment – A Surgeon's Guide, edited by Donald Ross, Terence English and Roxane McKay Springer-Verlag (Second Edition, London, 1992).
 23 chapters contributed to books.
 118 peer reviewed articles.

References

External links 

 
 
 By 1978 we were ready to go, Sir Terence English
 Sir Terence English Interview 2017
 

1932 births
Living people
British transplant surgeons
South African knights
South African Knights Commander of the Order of the British Empire
Fellows of the Royal College of Surgeons
Fellows of the Royal College of Physicians
Fellows of King's College London
People from Pietermaritzburg
Presidents of the British Medical Association
South African emigrants to the United Kingdom
Masters of St Catharine's College, Cambridge
University of the Witwatersrand alumni
1979 in medicine
Alumni of Hilton College (South Africa)